The following tables list railway and tramway terminology as used in different European languages. Included are English, German, Polish, Hungarian, French and Italian.

Types of rail/cable transport service

Vehicles

See also 

 Glossary of rail transport terms
 Glossary of United Kingdom railway terms
 Glossary of North American railway terms
 Glossary of Australian railway terms
 Glossary of New Zealand railway terms
 Passenger rail terminology

References and notes 

Rail transport in Europe
Tram transport
Technical terminology
Europe
Wikipedia glossaries using tables